Transcription elongation factor SPT4 is a protein that in humans is encoded by the SUPT4H1 gene.

References

Further reading